Thomas Mark Barrett (born December 8, 1953) is an American diplomat and politician who has served as the United States ambassador to Luxembourg since 2022. He previously served as the 44th mayor of Milwaukee, Wisconsin from 2004 until 2021.

A member of the Democratic Party, he was previously elected to the Wisconsin State Assembly (1984–1989), Wisconsin Senate (1989–1993) and U.S. House of Representatives (1993–2003). On April 6, 2004, Milwaukee elected Tom Barrett as its 40th mayor. He won reelection in 2008, 2012, 2016 and 2020. When he left office, Barrett was the longest-serving current mayor of one of the 50 largest cities in the United States.

Early life, education and early career
Barrett is the oldest son of Gertrude Virginia (of German and English descent) and Thomas J. Barrett (of Irish descent). His father was a World War II veteran who was awarded the Distinguished Flying Cross in 1944 for 30 missions over Germany as a navigator. His mother was a war widow when she met his father at the University of Wisconsin-Madison. They married and moved to Milwaukee, where Barrett was born. He grew up on the city's west side.

Barrett graduated from Marquette University High School; he went on to earn his Bachelor of Arts in economics from the University of Wisconsin–Madison in 1976 and his Juris Doctor from the University of Wisconsin Law School in 1980. He helped put himself through college and law school by working on the Harley-Davidson assembly line. After law school, Barrett served as a law clerk for Judge Robert W. Warren on the United States District Court for the Eastern District of Wisconsin from 1980 to 1982. He later entered into private practice and served as a bank examiner for the Federal Deposit Insurance Corporation.

State Assembly and Senate
Barrett made his first run for office at the age of 28 for the Wisconsin State Assembly in 1982, but was unsuccessful. He ran again in 1984, this time successfully; he served two terms before making a successful run for the Wisconsin Senate in a December 1989 special election. He continued to serve in the Wisconsin Senate until moving to higher office in 1993.

U.S. House of Representatives

In 1992, after U.S. Representative Jim Moody announced his intention to run for the United States Senate, Barrett successfully ran to succeed him. Barrett was reelected four more times to represent Wisconsin's 5th congressional district, which at the time included the northern half of the City of Milwaukee and some adjoining suburban municipalities. While in Congress, Barrett served on the Committee on Energy and Commerce, as well as the Government Reform Committee, Financial Services Committee, Ways and Means Committee and the House Administration Committee.

As a U.S. Representative, Barrett worked with his colleagues to secure aid for flood remediation projects in his district. He also worked to modernize the Community Reinvestment Act and frequently voiced his support of Milwaukee's Midwest Express Airlines. Barrett sponsored 37 bills and co-sponsored 1345 bills between January 5, 1993, and October 10, 2002. He was a delegate to the 2000 Democratic National Convention from Wisconsin.

Mayor of Milwaukee

Elections
In 2004, Barrett ran successfully for mayor of Milwaukee, defeating incumbent Acting Mayor Marvin Pratt, who took office following the resignation of John Norquist. Barrett was reelected in 2008 with 79% of the vote, the largest percentage a mayoral candidate had received in 40 years. In 2012 he was subsequently reelected against challenger Edward McDonald with over 70% of the vote. In 2016, Barrett was reelected with 70% of the vote over conservative 8th district alderman Robert Donovan. In 2020, Barrett was reelected to a fifth term with over 62% of the vote against Lena Taylor.

Development
During Barrett's tenure, the city has seen billions dollars worth of new downtown developments. Barrett made great use of subsidies and tax incremental financing for developments. Barrett focused heavily on downtown development, with the city seeing its largest construction boom since the 1960s. The city's downtown experienced a major construction boom that included several new skyscrapers, such as the Northwestern Mutual Tower and Commons.

In 2018, Barrett announced a plan to construct 10,000 units of affordable housing in the city. The plan included an expansion of the use of tax-incremental financing districts.

Barrett made an effort to revive struggling areas of the city by encouraging businesses to relocate to areas near lower-income neighborhoods.

Economic matters
On February 25, 2009, Barrett gave his State of the City Address. Where he praised the city's past achievements and outlined his plan to increase green jobs, economic development and workforce training in the coming year. Barrett called on the citizens of Milwaukee to remain optimistic during the international economic downturn; "I am fully confident that Milwaukee will withstand the current economic downturn," Barrett said. "We will make smart investments, continue to build strong partnerships, provide training to our workforce and improve our public schools. We will emerge as a stronger and more competitive city." Barrett met with Vice President of the United States Joe Biden and testified before the United States House Transportation Subcommittee on Water Resources and Environment when he traveled to Washington, D.C. on March 18, 2009. Barrett attended a White House Recovery and Reinvestment Act Implementation Conference hosted by Biden. The conference addressed questions from state, county, and local government officials on how to effectively oversee the spending of Recovery Act funds.

Environment

Mayor Barrett has enacted his vision for a greener Milwaukee through the formation of Milwaukee's Green Team the establishment of Milwaukee's Office of Sustainability. The Office of Sustainability promotes cost-effective environmental sustainability practices that meet Milwaukee's urgent environmental, economic and social needs while enhancing long-term economic growth. He is also one of the region's greatest champions for the Great Lakes and previously served as Co-Chair of the Great Lakes St. Lawrence Cities Initiative, an binational organization of mayors and other local officials that works actively to advance the protection and restoration of the Great Lakes and the St. Lawrence River.

COVID-19 pandemic
During the COVID-19 pandemic in the United States, Barrett took a number of actions. On March 23, citing concerns of the ongoing coronavirus pandemic, Mayor Barrett sent a letter to Governor Tony Evers, State Senate Majority Leader Scott L. Fitzgerald and Speaker of the State House Robin Vos, requesting that the April 7 elections (including the mayoral election, as well as Wisconsin's presidential primaries and others races) be conducted using mail-in ballots only. Barrett lent his backing to a proposal authored by the Department of City Development under which business improvement districts would be allowed to spend money on assisting companies and property owners hurt by the pandemic without needing Common Council approval. Barrett lobbied the United States Army Corps of Engineers to establish a care facility at the Wisconsin State Fair Park.

Other matters
In April 2009, Wisconsin Governor Jim Doyle and Mayor Tom Barrett, joined by Superintendent of Public Instruction of Wisconsin Elizabeth Burmaster, announced a broad effort improve the Milwaukee Public Schools (MPS). The announcement followed the completion of a comprehensive independent review of the finances and non-instructional operations of MPS commissioned by the Governor and Mayor in October 2008.

In 2013, he was one of nine mayors who established July 15 as Social Media Giving Day, encouraging citizens to support charities via social media.

Barrett was an advocate for the construction of The Hop streetcar system.

Mayor Barrett was involved in Milwaukee's successful bid to host the 2020 Democratic National Convention.

U.S. Ambassador to Luxembourg
On August 25, 2021, President Joe Biden announced his intent to nominate Barrett to serve as the United States Ambassador to Luxembourg. Hearings on his nomination were held before the Senate Foreign Relations Committee on November 2, 2021. The committee favorably reported the nomination on December 15, 2021. The United States Senate confirmed him on December 16, 2021, by voice vote. He was sworn in by Judge Lynn Adelman in Milwaukee on December 23, 2021, and arrived in Luxembourg on January 28, 2022. On February 10, 2022, he presented his credentials to the Grand Duke of Luxembourg at the Grand Ducal Palace in Luxembourg City.

Gubernatorial bids

2002

Barrett decided to run for governor in 2002 when he decided to leave Washington D.C. after nearly a decade of service in the U.S. House of Representatives. He did so as a means spend more time in Milwaukee and Wisconsin with his family. Additionally, Wisconsin had lost a seat after the 2000 Census, and the new map resulted in Barrett's district being merged with the 4th district on the other side of Milwaukee, represented by fellow Democrat Jerry Kleczka. Although the merged 4th was more Barrett's district than Kleczka's, Barrett announced his candidacy for governor in 2001, effectively handing the merged 4th to Kleczka.

In a heated Democratic primary, Barrett came in a close second to then-Attorney General Jim Doyle, who went on to win the general election.

2010

In August 2009, Doyle announced his decision to not seek reelection to a third term in 2010, leading many to believe Barrett would run for governor. On August 25, a group named "Wisconsin for Tom Barrett" formed, encouraging Barrett to run. On October 26, a website, TomForGovernor.com, was launched after Barbara Lawton, the Lieutenant Governor, backed out. A story in The Politico reported that President Barack Obama's political director Patrick Gaspard met with Barrett on November 4, 2009, amid speculation that the White House wanted him to run for Governor of Wisconsin.

Barrett ended months of speculation by officially announcing on November 15, 2009, that he would enter the race for governor. Barrett's campaign raised more than $750,000 in its first seven weeks. In an e-mail thanking supporters, Barrett said his campaign had more than $1.5 million in the bank, a significant start given that he did not declare candidacy for the Democratic primary until November 15, 2009. Barrett ultimately lost the election to Scott Walker.

2012 recall election 

After the contentious collective bargaining dispute, Walker's disapproval ratings varied between 50 and 51%, while his approval ratings varied between 47 and 49% in 2011. In a survey of 768 Wisconsin voters conducted between February 24–27, 2011, during the 2011 Wisconsin budget protests, a poll by Public Policy Polling found that 52% of respondents said they would vote for Barrett if the election had been held then, while 45% said they would vote for Walker.  Wisconsin law made Walker eligible for recall beginning January 3, 2012, and the Wisconsin Democratic Party had called it a "priority" to remove him from office, although the signatures on the petitions were not verified.

Barrett ended months of speculation by officially announcing on March 30, 2012, that he would enter the race for governor. The American Federation of State, County and Municipal Employees and the Wisconsin Education Association Council, which already supported another Democrat who had announced, had met with Barrett in late December 2011 and tried unsuccessfully to keep him from entering the race. On May 8, Barrett won the Democratic primary for the recall election.

A Marquette Law School Poll released on May 30 (mirroring other polling outlets) had Barrett trailing Walker 52% to 45% among likely voters. The results represent a six-point increase for Walker over Barrett since Marquette's earlier poll in late April. The poll's margin of error for likely voters was plus or minus 4.1 percentage points. Odysseas, a contributor to the progressive blog Daily Kos, had questioned if the Marquette University Law school poll oversampled "right wingers." For example, a poll by Public Policy Polling conducted May 11–13 gave Republicans a 7% edge over Democrats in terms of likely voters, unlikely given Wisconsin voter registration patterns. However, in retrospect the Marquette poll accurately reflected the Wisconsin electorate's vote. However, the same poll showed President Obama holding a lead over Mitt Romney 51–43. On May 21, the Milwaukee Journal-Sentinel endorsed Scott Walker over Barrett arguing "[there is] no reason to remove Walker from office." The Journal-Sentinel had previously endorsed Walker over Barrett in 2010. Walker defeated Barrett in the June 5 recall election by garnering 53.2%-46.3%, a similar margin to the 2010 election. Walker thus became the first Governor in US history to survive a recall election.

Personal life
Barrett and his wife still live in Milwaukee's Washington Heights neighborhood, blocks away from his childhood home, where they raised their four, now adult, children Tommy, Annie, Erin and Kate, who all attended Milwaukee German Immersion School.

2009 Wisconsin State Fair attack
Barrett was the subject of national news headlines when he was attacked outside the Wisconsin State Fair on August 15, 2009, by a man wielding a pipe. Barrett and some family members were leaving the fair when he responded to a woman's cries for help. They encountered a man and a woman in a heated confrontation. While the mayor called the police, the man, 20-year-old Anthony J. Peters, attacked him with a pipe. Barrett was hospitalized after the incident and again later for reconstructive surgery for his hand. Governor Jim Doyle visited Barrett in the hospital the next morning and said he "found him to be in good spirits and looking good considering what happened... The mayor's heroic actions clearly saved a woman and others from harm", Doyle said in a statement. Peters was arrested the next day. Both President Barack Obama and Vice President Joe Biden telephoned Barrett in the hospital to inquire as to his condition; Obama told Barrett that he went above the call of duty and said he was proud of Barrett's actions. Barrett's injuries included broken teeth, a permanently damaged hand, as well as blows to the head where he was struck with the pipe. Peters plead guilty and was sentenced to 12 years in prison and a further 10 years of supervision.

Electoral history

U.S. House of Representatives

Mayor of Milwaukee

Gubernatorial bids

See also
 List of mayors of the 50 largest cities in the United States
 Zapple doctrine − role in 2012 campaign

References

External links

 Mayor Tom Barrett official government site

 
 Appearances at the Internet Movie Database

|-

|-

|-

|-

|-

1953 births
20th-century American lawyers
20th-century American politicians
21st-century American politicians
Ambassadors of the United States to Luxembourg
American people of Irish descent
Candidates in the 2010 United States elections
Candidates in the 2012 United States elections
Democratic Party members of the United States House of Representatives from Wisconsin
Living people
Marquette University High School alumni
Mayors of Milwaukee
University of Wisconsin Law School alumni
University of Wisconsin–Madison College of Letters and Science alumni
Wisconsin lawyers
Democratic Party Wisconsin state senators
Democratic Party members of the Wisconsin State Assembly